The M1 and M3 are two similar series of electric multiple unit rail cars built by the Budd Company for the Long Island Rail Road, the Metro-North Railroad and Metro-North's predecessors, Penn Central and Conrail. Originally branded by Budd as Metropolitans, the cars are more popularly known under their model names, M1 (late 1960s/early 1970s cars) and M3 (mid 1980s cars). The Metro North cars were branded under the M1A and M3A series.

Overview

Even though the LIRR's fleet of some 900 MP54 electric MU cars constructed between 1908 and 1930 had been augmented between 1955-1963 by about 150 newer MP72 and MP75 EMUs, the roster still contained a large number of increasingly elderly prewar cars which the cash strapped LIRR was unable to replace. In 1965 the nearly bankrupt commuter railroad was taken over by the state owned Metropolitan Commuter Transportation Authority, later renamed the Metropolitan Transportation Authority in 1968, which was then able to provide large amounts of capital funding to bring the system to a state of good repair. One of the first items on the list was a massive order of brand new self-propelled electric railcars that could replace the remaining MP54s and provide modern levels of comfort and performance.

The Metropolitans, at the time of their introduction, were notable for their rounded ends and quarter-point sliding doors. The Metropolitan cars were also the catalyst of change for their respective systems as the high-level boarding required all stations in the electrified zone to be rebuilt from 1966-1968< and the increased power demand forced the LIRR to update its third rail power supply from 650 V DC to 750 V DC to take advantage of the cars' performance. On December 30, 1968 the M1s went into revenue service, with the first revenue train being an 8-car local from Babylon to Penn Station.

With a completely new look and feel both inside and out the Metropolitan cars blurred the line between traditional commuter rail and rapid transit with the later R44 and R46 series of cars for the sister New York City Subway adopting many of the same design elements. Compared to the older cars with their drop sash windows, slow speeds, rough suspension and growling gearboxes the Metropolitans ushered in a new era of commuting in the New York region.

M1/M1A series

The M1 series were funded by both New York State and the then-fledgling Metropolitan Transportation Authority which gained operation of the lines partway though the order. The 770 M1s (9001-9770) built for the LIRR between 1968 and 1973 represented the largest single order of electric multiple units in North America up until that time. 620 cars were in the base order from 1968–71, with 150 option cars following in 1973. Additional 178 M1As (8200-8377) were built for the former New York Central commuter operations from 1971 and 1973, allowing the railroad to replace its remaining pre-war MU cars and the 100 4500 series ACMUs (which were in need of a 20-year overhaul). Using Budd Pioneer III trucks and powered by four  GE 1255 A2 traction motors, each car had . They were designed to achieve  running in service, achieving only  in service due to track and signaling limitations. The LIRR cars also featured support for Automatic Train Operation, although this too was never seen in service.

The Cosmopolitans

On the heels of the success of the M1/M1As, the MTA and a joint venture between GE, Budd, Canadian Vickers and Avco produced a series of structurally similar cars for the New Haven Line. Built between 1972 and 1977, the M2s (initially branded by Budd as the Cosmopolitans) fully replaced the ex-New Haven EMU cars for use on the New Haven mainline and the New Canaan Branch. Budd and MTA would later license the design to other manufacturers for updated versions.

GTELs
In the late 1970s, eight "GTEL" (Gas Turbine-ELectric) trains were built; four were built by Garrett AiResearch and four by General Electric. These cars were numbered 4001-4008, and were powered by both a gas turbine engine and third rail collection for a dual mode operation. They were tested by the LIRR to see the feasibility of running such cars on non-electrified branches. They used the M1 bodies, but had low level boarding stairs. After around 1977, the cars were out of service. The Garrett-built cars were ultimately scrapped, while the General Electric-built cars became M1As for Metro-North.

M3/M3A series

With electrification areas of both railroads expanding, the MTA placed an order for another series in 1982, the M3 series. Essentially compatible with, and (on the exterior) very similar to, the M1 series, the M3s had updated mechanical elements such as the use of General Steel GSI 70 trucks and a few other small differences. Traction motor cooling was added to the M3 at the cost of added weight which was compensated for by the use of more powerful  GE 1261 motors. Even with the extra power this created different acceleration and braking rates from the M1. While LIRR chose to mix M1s and M3s in the same consist, Metro-North chose not to and would always run with uniform trainsets. A total of 174 M3s (9771–9944, with 9891 and 9892 renumbered to 9945 and 9946 after the Long Island Rail Road massacre) were produced for the LIRR between 1984 and 1986, while 142 M3As (8000–8141) were produced for Metro North, arriving between 1984 and early 1985.

This order would be the second-to-last handled by Budd, which in April 1987 left the railroad business after taking the name "TransitAmerica" under which the last M3s were produced though their builders plates kept the Budd name.

Refurbishment
With the arrival of the M3 series, the M1 and M1A cars each saw midlife rebuilds in the late 1980s in order to prolong their useful life. The overhauled interiors were very similar to those of the M3s. Still, time began to take its toll on the original M1 cars and by the end of the 20th century the time for the cars was running short.

Some Metro-North M3As received minor interior refreshes throughout 2006/2007. The LIRR M3s, however, have remained with their original, old-fashioned interior style of wood and faux leather.

In 1997, all M1s and M1As received headlights mounted on the center top of their front ended fiberglass bonnets to illuminate the top areas. This modification was done following an incident in which a Metro-North engineer operating an M1A train was severely injured and blinded when a cinderblock tied below a fence of an underpass crashed through the windshield of the train.

Retirement

M1
In 1999, the MTA awarded Bombardier Transportation the contract to build the replacement for the M1 series, the M7 series. With the arrival of the first M7s to the LIRR in 2002 and the first M7As to Metro North in 2004, both roads began to retire the M1 series. LIRR retired the last M1 cars in January 2007, while a small number of M1As remained in service on Metro-North until March 2009. In preparation of the retirement of the M1s, the Sunrise Trail chapter of the National Railway Historical Society hosted a "Farewell to the M1s" fan trip on November 4, 2006.

The Railroad Museum of Long Island in Riverhead, NY has preserved M1 pair 9547-9548. Pair 9411-9412 survive as training cars at the Nassau County Fire Service Academy in Bethpage. Cars 9401 and 9591 were renumbered to E401 and E591 (respectively) and serve as rail adhesion cars. Pair 9745-9746 was held for preservation by the New York Transit Museum and was stored around the system until May 2018, when it was taken off property for scrapping. Some cars were sold to USDOT for crash testing.

M3

In the 1990s, M3 car 9776 was wrecked in an accident and subsequently scrapped. Its mate, 9775, was converted to a rail adhesion car and renumbered to E775. On January 22, 2013, car 9870 retired when it collided with a car at Brentwood station and then caught fire. It is currently stored out of service. Its mate, 9869, was mated with 9772, which lost its mate 9771 due to electrical failures on that car. Car 9932, which lost its mate due to unknown reasons, was also converted to a rail adhesion car and renumbered to E932. In 2018, M3 pair 9901-9902 was converted to a pair of rail adhesion cars. The cars were renumbered to E901-E902. One car in each pair was retrofitted with high-powered lasers from Laser Precision Solutions from the Netherlands to incinerate leaf residue.

Between 2011 and 2013, twenty M3 cars were prematurely taken out of service and stripped of parts to keep the other cars running. They were taken off property to be scrapped in 2018.

By 2013, the MTA had spent nearly $2 billion to procure a replacement for the M3 series, the M9. The fleet is similar to the M7, and the first cars arrived in 2018. , there were 92 M9 cars planned, with options for up to 494 more. However, due to delays in the M9 contract, the Long Island Railroad is keeping around 100 M3 cars in service; the cars are expected to be rebuilt to last through at least 2024. Metro-North also planned to overhaul their M3A units, but later stated that they "are working with LIRR to procure new M9A cars in the next Capital Program to provide additional capacity and to replace their existing M3As instead of overhauling same."

See also
M2/M4/M6 (railcar)
M7 (railcar)
M8 (railcar)
M9 (railcar)
Budd Silverliner

Notes

References

External links

MTA Long Island Railroad official website
MTA Metro North Railroad official website

Long Island Rail Road multiple units
Metro-North Railroad multiple units
Budd multiple units
Rail passenger cars of the United States
Electric multiple units of the United States
750 V DC multiple units